The Eagle River is a stream,  long, in Anchorage, Alaska.

Course
Beginning at Eagle Glacier in Chugach State Park, the river soon intersects the Iditarod National Historic Trail, which follows the Eagle River Valley from near Crow Pass in Chugach National Forest to the community of Eagle River. Downstream of the trail crossing, the river flows by, but at considerable distance from, the Eagle River Nature Center, the visitor center for the park. The nature center lies along the North Fork Eagle River, which runs roughly parallel to the main stem for several miles. Eagle River Road, like the North Fork, lies to the right of the main stem, facing downstream.

After receiving the North Fork from the right, the Eagle River receives the South Fork Eagle River from the left before passing under Eagle River Loop Road. On its lower reaches, the river flows by the Eagle River community, which is on the right, and Eagle River Campground, on the left, before leaving the state park. It then passes under Glenn Highway and flows through Joint Base Elmendorf-Richardson, a military reservation, to Eagle Bay on Cook Inlet.

Boating
Parts of the Eagle River are floatable in a variety of watercraft. These sections are rated from Class I (easy) to Class III (difficult) on the International Scale of River Difficulty. Reaching a put-in place on the main stem west of the visitor center involves an arduous portage. A more accessible put-in place lies along the North Fork and Eagle River Road not far above the confluence with the main stem. Dangers include Class II (medium) and Class III rapids near Eagle River Campground, overhanging or submerged vegetation, and logjams.

Eagle River Nature Center

The Eagle River Nature Center, which sits at an entrance to Chugach State Park, is  up Eagle River Road. The center (in conjunction with "friends of") run numerous educational programs aimed at bringing people closer to nature through education and outdoor excursions.

The historic Crow Pass Trail, which runs  from the Eagle River Nature Center and ends near the town of Girdwood, remains a favorite backpacking trip.

See also
 List of rivers of Alaska

References

Anchorage metropolitan area
Rivers of Anchorage, Alaska
Rivers of Alaska